Frederick George "Rick" Wilson (born November 21, 1963) is an American political strategist, media consultant, and author based in Florida. A former member of the Republican Party, he has produced televised political commercials for governors, U.S. Senate candidates, Super PACs, and corporations.

Wilson was a frequent guest on political panel shows during the 2016 United States presidential election, where he denounced Donald Trump and his supporters. He was later a strategist for the Evan McMullin presidential campaign. Since Trump's election as president, Wilson has continued to be a critic.  In 2018, Wilson released Everything Trump Touches Dies.

Early life and education
Rick Wilson was born in Tampa, Florida, the son of an accountant and a housewife. According to Wilson, his parents were both "liberal Democrats" who later became Republicans. Wilson attended George Washington University.

Career
Wilson entered the political arena by campaigning for Connie Mack during the 1988 Florida Senate election. Later, he served on George H. W. Bush's campaign as Florida field director.

He left the Republican Party following the 2016 United States presidential election, and in late 2019 went on to co-found The Lincoln Project, a Super PAC organized by then-current and former Republicans opposed to and working to prevent the re-election of Donald Trump in the 2020 United States presidential election.

Media
Wilson has written numerous opinion and analysis columns for publications such as The Daily Beast, Politico, The New York Daily News, The Federalist, The Independent Journal Review, and Ricochet, and is a frequent guest on various cable and network news outlets.

In 2018, Wilson released his first book, Everything Trump Touches Dies, in which he laments the re-alignment of the Republican Party behind Trump. The book reached number one on the New York Times nonfiction bestseller list for a week. An audiobook read by Wilson was released alongside the print version.

Wilson's second book, entitled Running Against the Devil: A Plot to Save America from Trump – and Democrats from Themselves, was published in January 2020.

Since 2020, Wilson and fellow The Daily Beast contributor Molly Jong-Fast have been the hosts of the podcast The New Abnormal.

In October 2022, Wilson launched a new podcast entitled The Enemies List, named after Richard Nixon's famous list of political enemies.

Controversies 
In 2012, Wilson posted to Instagram an image of a cooler emblazoned with a Confederate flag and the words "The South Shall Rise Again", prompting allegations of racism. After public backlash, Wilson eventually deleted the post. It resurfaced in 2020 while The Lincoln Project, a political consultancy Wilson founded, was airing television ads attacking the public display of the Confederate flag.

Wilson played a significant role in the 2002 United States Senate election in Georgia, in which Saxby Chambliss was facing Democratic Party Senator Max Cleland, a disabled Vietnam veteran and recipient of the Silver Star. Wilson helped make an ad that criticized Cleland, while also tying him to Osama bin Laden and Saddam Hussein. The ad appeared to question Cleland's patriotism. In an interview with HuffPost, Wilson stated that he thought that "DHS [Department of Homeland Security] was on the front line against Osama bin Laden". As Wilson reflected in 2016, "The Cleland ad was powerful because it went to his strengths [...] Everyone assumed Cleland was immune to critiques on national security issues. [...] they didn't calculate that I have no moral center when it comes to political ads, and I will destroy the innocent and the guilty." Following Cleland's death in 2021, Wilson received criticism from journalists such as Glenn Greenwald and Charlie Pierce.

In January 2020, Wilson appeared alongside CNN anchor Don Lemon and CNN contributor Wajahat Ali to discuss United States Secretary of State Mike Pompeo's recent exchange with an NPR reporter Mary Louise Kelly. During this segment, Wilson made comments towards Trump supporters, stating they were "part of the credulous boomer rube demo."  He also employed the tone of Southern American English in the segment for emphasis. Wilson had been known to use extremely crude language and generalizations when criticizing supporters of Donald Trump, calling them "childless single men who masturbate to anime", during an interview with MSNBC leading up to the 2016 Presidential Election.  

In June 2020, Wilson tweeted a response to a 2012 Domino's Pizza tweet thanking White House Press Secretary Kayleigh McEnany, then a college student, for her opinion that Domino's pizza was superior to pizza from New York. In his tweet, Wilson declared, "You just killed your brand." This later prompted a response from Domino's Pizza's official Twitter account, saying "Welp. It's unfortunate that thanking a customer for a compliment back in 2012 would be viewed as political. Guess that's 2020 for ya." According to The Daily Dot, "Domino’s response immediately went viral"; however, it also credited Wilson for not deleting the tweet "despite the unrelenting onslaught of mockery" directed at him.

Personal life 
Wilson lives in Tallahassee, Florida, with his wife. They have two children.

References

External links 
 
 

1963 births
American political consultants
Florida Independents
Florida Republicans
George Washington University alumni
Living people
Criticism of Donald Trump
Aviators from Florida